Kiełpin is a former PKP railway station in Kiełpin (Pomeranian Voivodeship), Poland.

References 
Kiełpin article at Polish Stations Database, URL accessed at 7 March 2006

Railway stations in Pomeranian Voivodeship
Disused railway stations in Pomeranian Voivodeship
Człuchów County